Verdon College is a co-educational Roman Catholic high school in Invercargill, New Zealand, teaching students from year 7 to 15 (ages 11–18). The college is named after Bishop Michael Verdon (1838–1918) who was the second Catholic Bishop of Dunedin (1896–1918). It has the highest rate of achievement in NCEA results for secondary schools in Invercargill city.

In 2021, 97.1% of Year 11 students achieved NCEA Level 1, 90.3% of Year 12 students achieved NCEA Level 2, and 55.3% of Year 13 students achieved NCEA Level 3. In 2020, 14 students were given at least one Vocational Pathway Award.

History
Verdon College is a co-educational Catholic secondary school, created after an amalgamation in 1981 of Saint Catherine's College (single-sex high school for girls operated by the Dominican Sisters) and Marist College (single-sex high school for boys operated by the Marist Brothers). The Marist College site (which became Verdon College) was built on former farmland at the eastern boundary of Invercargill and opened in 1969. The new combined Catholic high school was named after Bishop Verdon. Since the schools growth parts of the school are located on what used to be Cargill High and Te Wharekura o Arowhenua.

Aerial Imagery 
These images are of the Marist College now Verdon College site.

Bishop Verdon Block
In the mid-2000s, Verdon college acquired a gymnasium and a full-sized S68 design classroom block on the site of the former Cargill High School. A multimillion-dollar refurbishment of the acquired classroom block was completed in 2008 and named the Bishop Verdon Block, mainly for the year seven and eight students. It also contains two computer suites, a library, a science laboratory, and a study atrium.

Roll
As at 1 July 2022, the college has a current roll of 704 students. The school's ethnic composition contained NZ European/Pākehā 52%, Māori 28%, Pasifika 5.5%, Asian 13.3% and other ethnicities including MELAA1.2%. Verdon has a higher proportion of Māori, Pasifika and Asian students than the overall composition of the Southland region.

The college offers a broad range of educational opportunities for student achievement in the areas of sport and culture as well as a diverse academic curriculum.

Cultural Activities

Bishop's Shield – Inter-school debating, scripture reading, public speaking and drama. They compete against the other Catholic schools in the Dunedin Diocese: St. Kevin's, Oamaru, Kavanagh College, Dunedin, and St Peter's College, Gore.
Inter-house Choir – Houses compete to win house points by performing a set song, as well as a song of their choice. 
Inter-house Drama – Competitions are held each year for the best drama performance from each house, with house points going to the winning house. 
Inter-house Haka – Each house performs the school haka, as well as a set song and a chosen waiata for house points. The 2022 competition is available to watch here: https://www.youtube.com/watch?v=mFQPZ3ybdnI
Inter-house Lip Sync – Junior (year 7–10) students from each house choreograph and perform a dance routine to a song of their choice. As the competition is held in the second last week of the Junior school year, the winning performers house receives house points that are carried onto the next year.
Music Festival – Students compete in various Junior/Senior categories including: Vocals, Instrumental and Group
Production –
Back to the 80s (musical) was performed in 2017.
Saturday Night Fever (musical) was performed in 2018.
All Shook Up (musical) was performed in 2019. 
School of Rock (musical) was to be performed in 2020, however due to the impact of COVID-19 the production was performed in 2021.
In 2022, a mash-up of previous productions and other famous Broadway musicals such as Joseph and the Amazing Technicolor Dreamcoat were performed. 
Sheilah Winn Shakespeare Festival – Each year, a number of students are selected to perform in the regional competition (Southland) against other schools in the area.

Other regional and national competitions that students compete in are:
 Chamber Music Festival
 ILT Southland Secondary Schools' Jazz Fest
 Rock Quest
 Sound Quest
 Southern Jam Youth Jazz Festival

Sport

Sporting activities 
House Athletics Day – Interhouse athletics competition where houses compete for house points.
Southland-Wide Under 18 Competition – Verdon competes with other Southland secondary school First XV rugby teams in a competition spanning from April until August. Notable competition wins include the 2012 in which Verdon beat St Peter's College 15–12 in the final.
New Zealand Secondary Schools Netball – The Verdon Senior A Netball team are regular participants at the New Zealand Secondary Schools Netball competition and have won the nationwide tournament twice.
Quad Tournament – Verdon competes in an annual tournament weekend with St Peter's College, Kavanagh College, St Kevin's College and Roncalli College. Verdon has yet to have won a tournament weekend so far. There are both senior and junior tournaments, both at opposite ends of the winter season.
Swimming sports – Every year, students compete in various water sports for house points.
Year 12 vs Year 13 Rugby League – Each year, the two year groups battle for the unofficial title of the winners of the League Cup. This event is organised by the students.

Sports offered at the college 
Verdon offers many sporting opportunities for the students, such as:

 Badminton
 Basketball
 Cricket
 Cycling
 Dance
 Football
 Futsal
 Hockey
 Indoor Bowls
 Netball
 Rugby
 Softball
 Squash
 Volleyball
 Waterpolo

Notable students

Ex-pupils of Verdon College or its predecessor schools, St Catherine's College and Marist College.
 Dion Bates – Current Southland Stags rugby union player.
 Dan Buckingham – Olympic Paralympian athlete.
 John Burke (born 1946) – former mayor of Porirua City (Marist)
 Colin Campbell (born 1941) -  Roman Catholic Bishop of Dunedin (2004–2018) (Marist)
 Dan Davin (1913-1990) – soldier, writer, publisher (Marist)
 Aliyah Dunn – New Zealand netball international 
 Wendy Frew – New Zealand netball international
 Jess Hamill – New Zealand Paralympics competitor and Commonwealth Games shot put silver medalist.
 Te Huinga Reo Selby-Rickit – New Zealand netball international
 Tom Scully – Professional cyclist.
 Douglas Sekone-Fraser – 2009 New Zealand Weightlifting Champion, Silver and Bronze in 2011 for the New Zealand Weightlifting Championships and 16th in the Junior World Championships.
Hua Tamariki – rugby union player
Stephen McDowell – Creative director and content creator of Buzzy Kiwi, and also was the runner-up to The Apprentice Aotearoa in 2021.

Notes 
1.MELAA is defined by Statistics New Zealand as Middle Eastern, Latin American and African.

References

Sources

 Pat Gallager, The Marist Brothers in New Zealand Fiji & Samoa 1876–1976, New Zealand Marist Brothers' Trust Board, Tuakau, 1976.

Educational institutions established in 1982
Schools in Invercargill
Catholic secondary schools in New Zealand
Secondary schools in Southland, New Zealand
1982 establishments in New Zealand